is a Japanese footballer currently playing as a midfielder for Tegevajaro Miyazaki from 2023.

Career
On 26 December 2022, Higashide joined to J3 Club, Tegevajaro Miyazaki for upcoming 2023 season.

Career statistics

Club
.

Notes

References

External links

1998 births
Living people
People from Tsu, Mie
Association football people from Mie Prefecture
Hokuriku University alumni
Japanese footballers
Association football midfielders
J2 League players
J3 League players
Roasso Kumamoto players